Robat Mil (also Romanized as Robāţ Mīl and Robāţ-e Mīl; also known as Marān and Robāţ) is a village in Sedeh Rural District, in the Central District of Arak County, Markazi Province, Iran. At the 2006 census, its population was 967, in 279 families.

References 

Populated places in Arak County